Tirap Gaon, Ledo also known as Tirap Colliery, is a small village in Margherita Tehsil in Tinsukia District of north-eastern state Assam, India. It is located around 3 km away from nearest town Ledo, 11 km away from  sub-divisional town Margherita and 60 km away from district headquarter Tinsukia. Tirap Gaon is connected to Makum by National Highway 38 (old numbering). 

The Indian census counts Tirap Gaon as two villages: No.1 and No.2.

This place is known for opencast coal mining since 1983 under North Eastern Coalfields, a unit of Coal India Limited. In 2018–2019, an international team of researchers discovered fossil impressions of two previously unknown species of bamboo (Bambusiculmus tirapensis and Bambusiculmus makumensis) in the Tirap coalmine. These fossils date back to about 25 million years ago, falling in the late Oligocene period. This discovery strengthened the theory that bamboo came to Asia from India and not from Europe. It also challenged the previous hypothesis that Asian bamboo spread from the Yunnan region of China to India.

Nearest town and villages 
 Ledo, Assam
 Lekhapani
 Margherita
 Tipong
 Jagun

References

External links
 M.D.K. Girls’ College, Dibrugarh made an educational tour to Tirap Colliery
 NEC Coal India Limited flayed for dismissing 340 security guards
 Students' protest hits in Ledo Tirap coal field

Cities and towns in Tinsukia district
Tinsukia